2719 may refer to:
2719 (number)
2719, a year in the 28th century
2719 BC, a year in the 28th century BC
2719 Suzhou, an asteroid

See also